The 2021–22 Alcorn State Braves basketball team represented Alcorn State University in the 2021–22 NCAA Division I men's basketball season. The Braves, led by second-year head coach Landon Bussie, played their home games at the Davey Whitney Complex in Lorman, Mississippi as members of the Southwestern Athletic Conference.

Previous season
The Braves finished the 2020–21 season 6–13, 6–7 in SWAC play to finish in sixth place in conference. They lost in the first round of the SWAC tournament to Texas Southern.

Offseason

Departures

Incoming transfers

Recruiting class

Roster

Schedule and results 

|-
!colspan=12 style=| Non-conference regular season

|-
!colspan=9 style=| SWAC regular season

|-
!colspan=12 style=| SWAC tournament

|-
!colspan=12 style=| NIT

Sources

References

Alcorn State Braves basketball seasons
Alcorn State Braves
Alcorn State Braves basketball
Alcorn State Braves basketball
Alcorn State